Big Boss Band is the 1990 studio album of George Benson on Warner Bros. featuring the Count Basie Orchestra. This is Benson's second consecutive album which returns to his jazz roots after his successful pop career in the 1980s, and also his debut as sole producer of an album. The genre is mainly big band swing with some Michel Legrand and R&B thrown in.

Concept
In his liner notes, Benson writes that in 1983 he made a promise to Count Basie "to do his (Basie's) music justice" on an album such as Big Boss Band. He continues: "The spirit of the Basie Legacy permeated these sessions as I approached each one (song) in the way I believed the Count would have wanted." He thanks to Frank Foster III for his contribution and notes that he "was Basie's only choice" to arrange this album.

Reception

The album was criticized by jazz writers for not being jazzy enough, for the vocal performance and for not being able to grab the opportunity of making a jazz classic.

Awards
Frank Foster received Grammy Award for his arrangement of George Benson's composition “Basie’s Bag” (Best Jazz Instrumental Performance, Big Band, 1990).

Track listing

Personnel

Musicians:
 George Benson – guitar, vocals (1, 3–9)
Count Basie Orchestra (1-4, 6, 8, 9, 10):
 Carl "Ace" Carter – acoustic piano
 Charlton Johnson – guitar
 Cleveland Eaton – bass
 Duffy Jackson – drums
 David Glasser – alto saxophone, alto sax solo (2)
 Danny Turner – alto saxophone
 Johnny Williams – baritone saxophone
 Frank Foster III – arrangements (1-5, 8, 9, 10), tenor saxophone, tenor sax solo (2)
 Kenneth Hing – tenor saxophone
 Doug Miller – tenor saxophone
 Clarence Banks – trombone
 Melvin Wanzo – trombone
 Tim Williams – trombone
 Bill Hughes – bass trombone
 George Cohn – trumpet
 Bob Ojeda – trumpet, backup trumpet solo (2), arrangements (6)
 Byron Stripling – trumpet, backup trumpet solo (4)
 Mike Williams – trumpet

Additional Musicians:
 Barry J. Eastmond – acoustic piano (3), keyboards (3)
 Terry Burrus – keyboards (5)
 Richard Tee – keyboard bass (5)
 David Witham – keyboards (5)
 Ron Carter – bass (3)
 Bashiri Johnson – percussion (5)
 Ralph MacDonald – percussion (5)
 Carmen Bradford – vocals (3)

New York Horns (5):
 Larry Farrell – trombone
 Paul Faulise – trombone
 Keith O'Quinn – trombone
 James Pugh – trombone
 Randy Brecker – trumpet
 Jon Faddis – trumpet
 Earl Gardner –  trumpet
 Lew Soloff – trumpet

Robert Farnon Orchestra (7):
 Robert Farnon – arrangements
 uncredited UK musicians

Production:
 George Benson – producer, liner notes 
 Al Schmitt – co-producer (Track 7), recording, mixing
 Russ Defilippis – production assistant for Broadway Productions.
 Peter Darmi – recording
 Elliot Scheiner – recording
 Dave Russell – additional recording
 Jeff Toone – additional recording
 Ed Rak – mixing
 Greg Calbi – mastering at Sterling Sound (New York, NY).
 Emile Charlap – musical contractor
 Aaron Woodward – musical contractor
 Lucrecia Snead – project administrator
 Michon C. Stanco – album package coordinator
 Mary Ann Dibs – art direction
 Lorna Stovall – design
 Robert Hakalski – photography
 Robin Lynch – grooming
 Alexander White – styling
 Ken Fritz Management, L.A. –  direction

Charts

References 

George Benson albums
1990 albums
Warner Records albums